Manso is a surname. Notable people with the surname include:

Alonso Manso (1460–1539), Spanish bishop
Damián Manso (born 1979), Argentine footballer
Frimpong Manso (born 1959), Ghanaian footballer and manager
Giovanni Battista Manso (17th century), Italian (Naples) patron of the arts, Marchese of Villa
Johann Kaspar Friedrich Manso (1760–1826), German historian and philologist
José Manso de Velasco, 1st Count of Superunda (1688–1767), Spanish soldier and politician
Shirley Frimpong-Manso (born 1977), Ghanaian film director, writer and producer
Will Manso (born 1975), American television journalist and host